Travers is a crater on Mercury. Its name was adopted by the International Astronomical Union (IAU) in 2018, after the British writer Pamela Lyndon Travers.

The scarps cutting across Travers crater are called Kainan Rupes.  They extend to the southwest of the crater.

References

Impact craters on Mercury